Boy is a masculine given name, nickname, and surname. It may refer to:

People with the given name 
 Boy Deul (born 1987), Dutch footballer
 Boy Ecury (1922–1944), member of the Dutch Resistance in World War II
 Boy Gobert (1925–1986), German film and television actor
 Boy Jati Asmara (born 1984), Indonesian footballer
 Boy de Jong (born 1994), Dutch footballer
 Boy Lornsen (1922–1995), German sculptor and author
 Boy Boy Martin (born 1985), Jamaican-Dutch kickboxer
 Boy Mondragon (born 1958), Filipino singer
 Boy van Poppel (born 1988), Dutch road racing cyclist
 Boy Waterman (born 1984), Dutch footballer
 Boy Westerhof (born 1985), Dutch professional tennis player

People with the nickname 

 Boy Abunda (born 1960), Filipino television host and talent manager
 Boy Asistio (1936–2017), Filipino politician
 Roy Brindley (born 1969), English professional poker player nicknamed "The Boy"
 Frederick Browning (1896–1965), British Army lieutenant-general called the "father of the British airborne forces"
 Boy Cabahug (born 1964), Filipino basketball player and coach
 Boy Capel (1881–1919), English polo player, lover and muse of fashion icon Coco Chanel
 Boy Charlton (1907–1975), Australian freestyle swimmer
 Boy George (born 1961), English singer/songwriter
 Boy Hayje (born 1949), Dutch racing driver
 Boy Logro (born 1956), Filipino celebrity chef
 Boy Gé Mendes (born 1952), Senegalese musician
 Boy Mould (1916–1941), British Royal Air Force flying ace
 Tadeusz Boy-Żeleński (1874–1941), Polish writer, poet and translator known by nickname "Boy" or pen-name Boy-Żeleński

People with the surname 
 Philipp Boy (born 1987), German gymnast
 Pat Boy (born 1949 or 1950), American politician
 Werner Boy (1879–1914), German mathematician

Fictional characters
 Boy (comics), in the comic book The Invisibles
 "Boy", the adopted son of Tarzan in some film adaptations of Tarzan
 Boy, a lion featured in the 1966 film Born Free
 Boy, the main antagonist of the 1989 film Little Monsters
 The Boy, Eustace Boyce, a character in the webcomic Scary Go Round

See also 
 
 
 Boy (disambiguation)
 Boys (surname)

Lists of people by nickname
Masculine given names